Jasper Township, Arkansas may refer to:

 Jasper Township, Crawford County, Arkansas
 Jasper Township, Crittenden County, Arkansas

See also 
 List of townships in Arkansas
 Jasper Township (disambiguation)

Arkansas township disambiguation pages